The 2006 Dickies 500 was a NASCAR Nextel Cup Series stock car race held on November 5, 2006 at Texas Motor Speedway in Fort Worth, Texas. Contested over 334 laps on the 1.5-mile (2.4 km) asphalt quad oval, it was the thirty-fourth race of the 2006 NASCAR Nextel Cup Series season. The race was extended to 339 laps because of a green-white-checker finish. Tony Stewart of Joe Gibbs Racing won the race.

Background

The track's turns are banked at twenty-four degrees, while the front stretch, the location of the finish line, is five degrees. The back stretch, opposite of the front, also has a five degree banking. The track layout is similar to Atlanta Motor Speedway and Charlotte Motor Speedway, tracks also owned by Speedway Motorsports.

Qualifying

Race recap
The eighth Chase race, the Dickies 500, was run on November 5, 2006 at Texas Motor Speedway in Fort Worth, Texas. Brian Vickers, the last car to qualify, edged Elliott Sadler, next to last to take time, for the pole in this race. After a DNF in Martinsville just two races ago, Jeff Burton lost an engine and fell greater than 67 laps down after more than one hour of repair, Burton finished 38th. Another chaser, Mark Martin spun out after Ken Schrader cut a tire on lap 174, putting Martin a 22nd-place finish. With less than 11 laps to go, chaser Kasey Kahne expired an engine during the 11th caution period and finished 32nd with a 2nd straight DNFs. With few laps to go, Kevin Harvick spun Scott Riggs to cause a caution and the race goes into a Green-white-checker finish. On the final restart, Tony Stewart held off Jimmie Johnson to win at Texas. Following the race, Craig Curione, the front tire carrier for the No. 10 Evernham Dodge driven by Scott Riggs, shoved Kevin Harvick, his wife Delana and NASCAR official John Sacco to the pavement after Harvick was blamed for a late race incident that led to the green-white-checkered finish. Curione was suspended indefinitely and fined $10,000 by NASCAR and fired from Evernham, while Sacco suffered a sprained ankle.

Results

Race Statistics
 Time of race: 3:46:11
 Average Speed: 
 Pole Speed: 196.235
 Cautions: 12 for 51 laps
 Margin of Victory: 0.272 sec
 Lead changes: 23
 Percent of race run under caution: 15%         
 Average green flag run: 24 laps

References 

Dickies 500
Dickies 500
NASCAR races at Texas Motor Speedway
Dickies 500